Solomona may refer to:

Solomona Sakalia (born 1991), New Zealand rugby union footballer
Se'e Solomona (born 1965), New Zealand rugby league footballer 
David Solomona (born 1978), New Zealand rugby league footballer
Malo Solomona (born 1987), New Zealand rugby league footballer
Denny Solomona (born 1993), rugby footballer
Tole’afoa Solomona To’ailoa, Samoan lawyer and politician